Clare Loring Randolph (May 2, 1907 – December 24, 1972) was a professional American football player who played center for seven seasons for the Chicago Cardinals, the Portsmouth Spartans, and the Detroit Lions.

References

External links

1907 births
1972 deaths
American football centers
Chicago Cardinals players
Detroit Lions players
Indiana Hoosiers football players
Portsmouth Spartans players
Players of American football from Chicago